Major Hazelton (born September 19, 1943) is a former professional football player. He played for the Chicago Bears after being drafted from FAMU where he was a football and track star. He went to Union Academy, a high school for African Americans in Bartow, Florida established during the segregation era. The school produced several star FAMU and NFL players, especially during Claude Woodruff era.

Hazelton played professionally as a 6'2" defensive back after being drafted by the Chicago Bears in the 3rd round (57th overall) during the 1968 NFL Draft. He played in 26 NFL games, starting in two. In college, he played football under legendary coach, Alonzo A. S. Gaither. He earned All-American honors as a defensive back in 1966 and 1967. In addition to football, Hazelton was a star track athlete and was a member of Florida A & M University's 4x100 relay team that won this event three years in a row (1966-68) at the Penn Relays. He is a member of Florida A & M University's Hall of Fame in both football and track and field.

References

1944 births
Living people
Sportspeople from Bartow, Florida
Players of American football from Florida
Florida A&M Rattlers track and field athletes
American male sprinters
Chicago Bears players
New Orleans Saints players
American football defensive backs
Florida A&M Rattlers football players
Track and field athletes in the National Football League